The 1992–93 Notre Dame Fighting Irish men's basketball team represented the University of Notre Dame during the 1992–93 college basketball season. The Fighting Irish, led by 2nd year coach John MacLeod, played their home games at the Joyce Center located in Notre Dame, Indiana as Independent members. The Fighting Irish finished the regular season with a record of 9–18. Forward Monty Williams was the team's captain and leading scorer, averaging 18.5 points per game.

Roster

Schedule

Players selected in NBA drafts

References 

Notre Dame
Notre Dame Fighting Irish men's basketball seasons
Notre Dame Fighting Irish
Notre Dame Fighting Irish